Akhran is a village and Panchayat halqa in Devsar tehsil in the Kulgam district of Jammu and Kashmir. According to the 2011 census, the total population of the village is 2,615. Village has a Government high school, a government middle school, an incomplete primary health center, a private middle school. It is in close proximity to NH-44. There is also a temporary army camp.The mirbazar-kulgam road crosses through the village. It is 1 mile from Mirbazar(NH-44).

References

Villages in Kulgam district